Hoburne Park is an area of Christchurch, Dorset.

History 
A residential area was built on the land of the original Hoburne Farm.

Services 
The main amenity in the area is the Hoburne Park Holiday Park.

Politics 
Fairmile is part of the Christchurch parliamentary constituency for elections to the House of Commons. It is currently represented by Conservative MP Christopher Chope.

References 

Areas of Christchurch, Dorset
Tourist attractions in Christchurch, Dorset